Brandon Paenga-Amosa (born 25 December 1995) is a New Zealand-born Australian rugby union player who plays for the Montpellier Hérault Rugby in the Top 14. His position of choice is hooker.

References 

1995 births
Australian rugby union players
Australian sportspeople of Samoan descent
Australia international rugby union players
Queensland Reds players
Rugby union hookers
Living people
People educated at Endeavour Sports High School
Greater Sydney Rams players
New South Wales Country Eagles players
Brisbane City (rugby union) players
Montpellier Hérault Rugby players
Rugby union players from Auckland